This is a list of compact disc player manufacturers. A CD player is an electronic device that plays audio compact discs. CD players are often a part of home stereo systems, car audio systems, and personal computers. They are also manufactured as portable devices. Modern units can play other formats in addition to PCM audio coding used in CDs, such as MP3, AAC and WMA. DJs often use players with an adjustable playback speed to alter the pitch and tempo of the music. CD playback functionality is also available on CD-ROM/DVD-ROM drive equipped computers as well as on DVD players and CD-ROM/DVD-ROM based game consoles.

Compact disc player manufacturers

  A&R Cambridge Ltd 
  Abbingdon Music Research 
  Accuphase 
  Audiolab 
  Bang & Olufsen 
  Bose Corporation 
  Boulder Amplifiers 
  Cambridge Audio 
  Classé 
  Creek Audio 
  Denon
  Densen Audio Technologies 
  Harman Kardon 
  Hegel Audio AS 
  Krell Industries 
  Linn Products 
  Luxman 
  Mark Levinson Audio Systems 
  Marantz
  McIntosh Laboratory 
  Meridian Audio 
  Mordaunt-Short 
  Musical Fidelity 
  NAD Electronics 
  Naim Audio 
  Pink Triangle (audio manufacturer) 
  PS Audio 
  Quad Electroacoustics 
  Rega Research 
  Roksan Audio 
  Rotel 
  Steinway Lyngdorf 
  T-Series 
  TEAC Corporation
  Yamaha Corporation 
  Yamaha Pro Audio

See also
 Consumer electronics

References

 
CD
List